Pleasant Island (Lingít: Wanachích) is the largest island in the Icy Strait between northern Chichagof Island and the mainland of the Alaska Panhandle. It lies southeast of the mainland city of Gustavus and southwest of the mainland community of Excursion Inlet. Pleasant Island has a land area of 49.192 km² (18.993 sq mi), had no population at the 2000 census, Colter Barnes is the only person who lives here.

Location 
The  Pleasant/Lemesurier/Inian Islands Wilderness is located in Icy Strait between Chichagof Island and the mainland on the north end of the Tongass National Forest. The Wilderness is made up of three large islands and a few small islands adjacent to them.

Access 
The wilderness is accessible by boat, kayak or float plane.

Area Description 
This grouping of relatively small islands is unique in that the three largest islands are very different in topography, use and character. Pleasant Island is fairly flat and has a mixture of old-growth forest and muskeg. The island has a couple of small lakes that can be hiked to from the shoreline. The island has many beaches friendly to small boats or kayaks and several areas that are used for camping. Pleasant Island is located just a couple of miles from Gustavus, Alaska, and Glacier Bay National Park. Many people kayaking to and from the park stop at Pleasant Island for lunch or a campover.

The top of the island is not forested like the rest, but is in the sub-alpine. There is one small lake on the south side of the island which can be hiked to from shoreline. There are half a dozen nice beaches around the south and north sides of the island where small boats or kayaks can approach and these coves are also good for camping. There are two small private parcels of land on the south side of this island.

The lnian Islands are even further west and are nearest the Pacific Ocean. They receive the high energy seas on the west side, characteristic of the outer coast. This grouping of half a dozen small islands offers refuge to boats from the swells, winds, and tides between the open ocean and Icy Strait. Caution should be used in traveling through the narrow openings between islands. The notorious laundry chute is an appropriate name as your boat can be swiftly drawn through this pass at certain tides. There are also two small private parcels of land on the main island.

The Strait is a passageway for a major portion of the water that travels through to the areas of Chatham Strait, Lynn Canal, and beyond. The higher the tides, the more the water moves through. Although this has a disadvantage in planning travel, it is also a key reason there is so much marine life in Icy Strait. This is an excellent place in southeast Alaska to watch for marine mammals. Humpback whales and Orca can be seen in abundance in Icy Strait as well as seals, Steller sea lions, sea otters, and porpoises. An abundance of sea and land birds can also be seen near the shores including murrelets, gulls, terns and bald eagles.

The islands host brown bears, Sitka black-tailed deer, marten, mink, land otter, red squirrels, ptarmigan, gray squirrels,  and grouse. The lnian Islands were used for fox farms in the 1920s and still provide harbor for commercial fishing vessels.

Facilities 
There are no public cabins, shelters or maintained trails on the islands

References

Pleasant Island: Block 1047, Census Tract 3, Skagway-Hoonah-Angoon Census Area, Alaska United States Census Bureau
 

Islands of the Alexander Archipelago
Islands of Hoonah–Angoon Census Area, Alaska
Uninhabited islands of Alaska
Islands of Alaska
Islands of Unorganized Borough, Alaska